Minion or Minions may refer to:

Places
Minions, Cornwall, a village in the United Kingdom

People 
Frank Minion (born 1929), American jazz and bop singer
Fred Minion, English professional footballer
Joseph Minion (born 1957), American film director and screenwriter
Marcus Fernaldi Gideon and Kevin Sanjaya Sukamuljo, Indonesian badminton men's doubles pair often called "the Minions"

Arts, entertainment, and media

Fictional characters
Minion, the title character's best friend from the animated film Megamind
Minion, a character and vehicle from the video game series Twisted Metal
Minions, the creatures controlled by the player character in Overlord
Alexander Minion, a character from the movie Spy Kids
Maelstrom's Minions, Marvel Comics supervillains Gronk, Helio, and Phobius that work for Maelstrom
Minions, characters from the Despicable Me franchise.

Films
Minions (film), a 2015 animated film based on the creatures from the Despicable Me franchise
Minions: The Rise of Gru, a 2022 animated film based on the creatures from the Despicable Me franchise
The Minion, a 1998 American and Canadian action supernatural horror film directed by Jean-Marc Piché

Games
Minions (video game), a 2008 Flash game featured on the Casual Collective website
Overlord: Minions, a 2009 puzzle video game for the Nintendo DS

Technology 
Minion (cannon), a type of cannon with a small bore during the 16th and 17th centuries
Minion (chat widget), a chat widget that runs in web browsers
Minion (solver), constraint solver
MinION, a  nanopore DNA sequencing platform developed by Oxford Nanopore Technologies

Other uses 
Minion (typeface), the name of a typeface designed by Robert Slimbach in 1990 for Adobe Systems
Minion (typography), the name of a type size between nonpareil and brevier

See also 
Henchman
Mignon (disambiguation)
Minnion (disambiguation)
Minyan, a quorum of Jewish worshippers